Danny Desriveaux (born December 20, 1981) is a former professional Canadian football slotback in the Canadian Football League for the Montreal Alouettes and the Toronto Argonauts. He was drafted by the Alouettes in the sixth round of the 2006 CFL Draft with the 43rd overall pick. He played college football for the Richmond Spiders and at Vanier College for the Cheetahs.

Desriveaux holds two university degrees; a bachelor's degree in finance from the University of Connecticut and an MBA from the University of Richmond.

References

External links 
Montreal Alouettes bio

1981 births
Living people
Sportspeople from Laval, Quebec
Players of Canadian football from Quebec
Canadian football slotbacks
Richmond Spiders football players
UConn Huskies football players
Montreal Alouettes players
Toronto Argonauts players
Canadian players of American football